Yinshan Hu Station (lit: "Yinshan Lake") is a station of Line 2 of the Suzhou Metro, located in Wuzhong District of Suzhou. It started operation on September 24, 2016, with the opening of the Baodaiqiao South - Sangtiandao extension on Line 2.

The station serves the Yinshan Lake area, a luxury urban area rapidly developing around the lake, which is actually a reservoir artificially constructed in 2004. The area has several dense population centers which rely on the station, including the Ministry of State Security's Jiangnan Social University.

References 

Railway stations in Jiangsu
Suzhou Rail Transit stations
Railway stations in China opened in 2016